Physocyclus californicus is a spider in the family Pholcidae ("cellar spiders"), in the infraorder Araneomorphae ("true spiders").
The distribution range of Physocyclus californicus includes the USA and Mexico.

References

Pholcidae
Spiders described in 1929